Thwaite may refer to:

Placenames 
Thwaite (placename element)
Thwaite, North Norfolk, England
Thwaite St Mary, South Norfolk, England
Thwaite, North Yorkshire, England
Thwaite, Suffolk, England

Buildings 
Thwaite Hall, University of Hull hall of residence
Thwaite Mills, industrial museum in Leeds, England
Thwaite Priory, former building in Lincolnshire, England

Other 
 Thwaite (surname)

See also 
 Thwaites (disambiguation)
 Thorp and thorpe, similarly archaic placename elements